Elizabeth Mary Jane Fish (22 December 1860 - 21 March 1944) was a schoolteacher and the first elected woman president of the Educational Institute of Scotland, the oldest teachers' trade union in the world.

Early life and education 
Elizabeth was born at 83 North Woodside Road in Glasgow, Scotland, in 1860 to Jane McNaughton and William Fish, a city missionary.

William was chaplain at Sharp's Institution in Perth and it was here that Elizabeth was schooled.

Elizabeth returned to Glasgow to become a pupil teacher, starting out at Henderson Street public school where she came first in Scotland in the Queen's Scholarship examination. Following this, she went on to study at the Glasgow Church of Scotland Training College.

In 1885, Elizabeth graduated LLA (lady literate in arts) from St. Andrews University, studying French and Italian, for which she was awarded the Society of Arts medal.

Career 
Between 1881 and 1895, she taught for the Glasgow School Board; teaching at Runford Street public school and Shields Road public school.

Elizabeth then went on to teach at the Pupil-Teachers Institute, Glasgow, from 1895 to 1907 before moving on to teach at Whitehill Higher Grade school and John Street Higher Grade school from 1907 to 1920.

Elizabeth also ran evening classes to help people who stammer and gave lectures in physiology and hygiene. She resisted calls from eugenicists to introduce 'race improvement' into teaching and believed 'sex hygiene' was a parental responsibility rather than something that should be introduced into the classroom.

Later years 
Elizabeth was president of the Scottish Modern Languages Association (SMLA) for two years and became principal teacher of Modern Languages at Bellahouston Academy in 1920 until her retirement in 1925.

She was a leading public figure in Glasgow and held office in the Glasgow branches of the Class Teachers' Association and the Educational Institute of Scotland (EIS) as convenor of the EIS Central Ladies Committee from 1902 onwards.

In June 1913, Elizabeth was elected the first woman president of the EIS.

She polled 4,822 votes compared with the other three male candidates whose combined vote totaled 3,068 votes.

Equal pay 
In January 1914, Elizabeth acknowledged that the question of equal pay was a controversial one for members of the Scottish and English Teachers' Associations and called for improvements to teachers' salaries during her presidential address at the annual congress.  While condemning the low pay of women teachers, she argued that:"If we teachers ask that the salaries of all teachers be now raised to the level of what men teachers think theirs ought to be, we shall alienate the sympathies of a public not yet convinced of the justice of our demand."

Death and legacy 
Elizabeth Fish died in Paisley Infirmary on 21 March 1944 after a fall at home.  She was 83.

The next day, her obituary in the Glasgow Herald described her as ‘the champion of women teachers in Scotland’.

References

1860 births
1944 deaths
British trade union leaders
Women trade unionists
19th-century Scottish women
20th-century Scottish educators
19th-century Scottish educators
Scottish schoolteachers
20th-century Scottish women